Penton Grafton is a village and civil parish in the Test Valley district of Hampshire, England. It is adjacent to the village and parish of Penton Mewsey.
Both villages are collectively known as The Pentons.

The town of Andover is approximately 2 miles (3 km) south-east from the village.

The village of Weyhill is included in the civil parish's boundaries.

References

External links

Penton Grafton Parish Council
Penton Grafton parish profile from Test Valley Council

Villages in Hampshire
Test Valley